The Old Post Office Building is a historic building in Brockton, Massachusetts.  The two story brick Colonial Revival-style post office was built in 1898 and expanded in 1932.  It was designed under the auspices of the federal government's supervising architect, James Knox Taylor, as a copy of Independence Hall in Philadelphia.  The building was renovated in 1977 and became home of the Brockton Public Schools central administration offices.

The building was added to the National Register of Historic Places in 1978.

See also 
Brockton City Hall
National Register of Historic Places listings in Plymouth County, Massachusetts
List of United States post offices

References 

Brockton
Buildings and structures in Brockton, Massachusetts
National Register of Historic Places in Plymouth County, Massachusetts